Racing Club de Lens (commonly referred to as RC Lens or simply Lens) is a French professional football club based in the northern city of Lens in the Pas-de-Calais department. Its nickname, les sang et or (the blood and gold), comes from its traditional colours of red and gold. Their traditional rivals are their northern neighbours Lille, with whom they contest the Derby du Nord.
Their most famous trophy is winning the championship in 1998.

History

Origin of the club
The club was established in 1906 in Lens by local students who enjoyed playing football on the city's Place Verte (the current Place de la République). The name "Racing Club de Lens" was chosen as a reference to Racing Club de Roubaix and Racing Club de France, both popular clubs at the time.

The club's first board of directors was formed by the parents of those students. The club originally played in green and black to represent the founding location; they wore green to represent the name of the home pitch, "Verte", (meaning 'green' in French), and black to represent the omnipresence of the coal mining industry in the surrounding area.

Between 1907 and 1912, the players were forced to change home grounds twice before settling at the Parc des Glissoires, situated between Avion and Lens.

During World War I, in common with all French sports clubs, the team's activities were stopped and did not restart until 1919. By this time, Lens had changed their playing colours to sky blue.

Of blood and gold
It was in 1924 that the red and gold colours first appeared. One legend says that Pierre Moglia, president of the club from 1923 to 1930, chose the colours of the Spanish flag after a colleague from the club remarked that the Saint-Léger church ruins, which they had walked past one evening, were the last visible remains of the local Spanish domination in 1648. Some people also say that the colours were derived as a reference to the local coal mines: the red for the blood of the miners and the gold for the coal which was valuable at the time.

It was also in 1924 that the club was authorised to play at the newly built municipal stadium Raoul Briquet (nowadays Léo Lagrange). The first match for the club in their new colours was played for the inauguration of the stadium.

In 1926, British footballer Kid Fenton was the first star who played for Lens. He  stayed for eight seasons and became a strong favourite with the club's supporters. This was also the year the first supporters group was formed, and also saw the first occasion that Lens captured the Championnat d'Artois.

In 1929, Lens won the North championship and won promotion for the first time to the Division d'Honneur of the Ligue du Nord with the clubs Olympique Lillois, RC Roubaix, Excelsior Athlétic Club de Roubaix and AC Amiens.

In the Artois League, the club steadily gained prestige, and in 1932 the club inaugurated the Stade Félix Bollaert.

The first victories

In 1937, Lens gained access to the first division after finishing first in the second division, led by such players as Stefan Dembicki and Spechtl. Lens even managed to reach the last 16 of the Coupe de France, although the team was eventually eliminated by the Red Star, 3–2.

In 1943, Lens won the first division of the Northern Zone thanks to Dembicki, who scored 43 goals in 30 games. A year earlier, in a Coupe de France match, he had scored 17 goals, which still remains to this day the world record for goals scored by one player in a single competitive match.

Immediately following World War II, Lens finished in sixth place in the 1945–46 season, but they were relegated the following year. In 1948, the club played its first Coupe de France final, which they lost 3–2 against Lille. A year later, Lens was promoted to the first division, and Maryan Wisnieski was recruited, in 1953. Problems with the board, however, made him quit the club; he joined Italian club UC Sampdoria Genoa, though without much success.

In 1962, the city of Lens' mines were shut down and the future of the club was at stake, given that most of the players were miners by profession. Between 1956 and 1968, survival was hard. Nevertheless, in 1964, Lens finished third, with Ahmed Oudjani the top scorer with 30 goals. Another famous player, Georges Lech, joined Lens, although the club was relegated in 1968. The following year, the mine's administrators rescinded their ownership of Lens, which signalled the end of professional football at the Stade Bollaert-Delelis. Lens was now once again an amateur club, one year after its relegation, and the long-term future looked very bleak.

The good years and the fall
However, better days arrived in 1960 after the town council took interest in Racing Club de Lens. Lens' mayor, André Delelis, was a long-term supporter and recognized the importance of the club's success to the overall morale of the city. With the future president, Jean Bondoux, the mayor brought together volunteers and subscriptions to help the club survive. Moreover, the city recovered ownership of the stadium from the closing mine industry.

The following twenty years saw a slow but steady improvement in the club's fortunes. In 1972, Lens reached the semi-finals of the Coupe de France, and the arrival of two Polish players helped the club win promotion to the first division. In 1975, Lens once again reached the final of the Coupe de France against the powerful Saint-Étienne, but lost the game 0–2.

As finalist of the Coupe de France, Lens had the opportunity to participate in its first UEFA Cup Winners' Cup, but the team was knocked out quickly by the Dutch club ADO Den Haag.

Lens' steady progress continued, and after finishing second in the league behind Nantes, they managed to qualify to the UEFA Cup. They knocked out Swedish club Malmö FF, and more impressively, the strong Italian club Lazio. After an away defeat (2–0), they won 6–0 at the Stade Bollaert-Delelis after extra-time. Unfortunately, after this rare international exploit for a French club, they were then eliminated by East German side 1. FC Magdeburg. Worse still, the club went back to the second division in 1978.

The step backwards was very brief and immediate promotion back to the French elite level was achieved in 1979 with Roger Lemerre as head coach. During the 1980s, Gérard Houllier and Joachim Marx succeeded him. These were great gains to the team, even though the club lost important players such as Didier Sénac, Gaëtan Huard and Philippe Vercruysse.

Martel's takeover
In August 1988 Gervais Martel, a wealthy local businessman, bought control of the club, with the help of Serge Doré. During the same year, Arnaud Dos Santos was named head coach of the club, and led the club back to the first division in 1991.

In 1993 and 1994, Lens' strongest team to that date were highly competitive at the top of the league, and the team qualified for the UEFA Cup twice in a row. Lens also reached the semi-final of the Coupe de France after knocking out Paris Saint-Germain at the Parc des Princes, although the team lost to Montpellier.

In 1998, es Sang et Or wrote the best page of their history under Daniel Leclercq ("the Druid"): French champions, Coupe de la Ligue semi-finalists and finalists of the Coupe de France (against PSG, a 2–1 defeat). Like a symbol, it is a player who started his career in Lens, Yohan Lachor, who scored the goal in Auxerre giving Lens the title in front of Metz. Under the "Druid", Lens won its second major title in 1999 with the Coupe de la Ligue against Metz, with a goal from Daniel Moreira. That year, in the UEFA Champions League, Lens also became the only club to have beaten English team Arsenal at the famous Wembley Stadium (1–0, with a goal from Mickaël Debève), although they were knocked out on aggregate score over two matches.

During the next season, Leclercq was fired, but Lens nonetheless did well to reach the semi-finals of the UEFA Cup. François Brisson's men were eventually eliminated by Arsenal, after they won against 1. FC Kaiserslautern (a 4–1 win in Germany), Atlético Madrid and Celta de Vigo.

In the 2001–02 season, Joël Muller was named head coach. Lens finished second that season and qualified for its second Champions League campaign. The club, however, finished in eighth for the next two years. Muller was replaced during his fourth season by Francis Gillot, who managed to qualify Lens for the UEFA Intertoto Cup, which Lens won, ensuring qualification for the UEFA Cup.

During the 2006–07 season, the Sang et Or finished the first part of the season in second, behind Lyon. But due to a chaotic second half, however, they only finished fifth. A few days later, Francis Gillot resigned.

On 5 June 2007, Guy Roux made his comeback, although it only lasted three months: He resigned after a 2–1 defeat at Strasbourg. Jean-Pierre Papin took over, but Lens could not make up any ground throughout the season, finishing 18th, two points behind Toulouse, resulting in relegation to Ligue 2 for the next season. Lens finished the season with just 40 points, winning only 9 times in 38 matches.

After a slow start in their only year in Ligue 2, they managed to finish as leaders during the first half of the season. Earning 13 out of 15 points in their first five games of the second half, everything looked set for a quick return to the first league. After only taking five points of the next six games, however, the promotion race was open again, although Lens recovered and became champions, securing promotion to Ligue 1 for 2009–10. After the 2010–11 season, however, they again dropped to Ligue 2.

On 16 May 2014, Lens sealed promotion back to Ligue 1 on the final day of the season following a 2–0 win at Bastia. On 27 June, however, the League's National Directorate of Management Control (DNCG) blocked Lens' promotion to the top flight due to irregularities in the club's proposed budget for its next season. The issue was a €10 million payment due from major shareholder Hafiz Mammadov that was missing from the accounts. Lens president Gervais Martel claimed a public holiday in Mammadov's native Azerbaijan had resulted in the delay and said the club would appeal. On 15 July, however, their promotion was in jeopardy after an appeal commission upheld their appeal since the missing funds still had not yet arrived in the club's accounts. Lens immediately declared their intention to appeal to the French Olympic Committee (CNOSF), which has the power to overrule the DNCG. On 25 July, the CNSOF recommended Lens should be allowed to play in Ligue 1. Because the Stade Bollaert-Delelis was being renovated for UEFA Euro 2016, Lens played their home matches for the 2014–15 Ligue 1 season at the Stade de la Licorne, home of Amiens, and at the Stade de France in Saint-Denis.

It was announced on 29 January 2015 that Lens' promotion from Ligue 2 at the end of the 2013–14 season has been ruled invalid, and will thus be automatically relegated to Ligue 2 for the 2015–16 season, regardless of where the team places. Thus, in August 2015 Lens returned to Ligue 2, albeit playing at the renovated Stade Bollaert-Delelis. They drew an average home attendance of 28,996 in the 2016–17 season, the highest in Ligue 2 but missed promotion to the Ligue 1 during a tumultuous last day of the season.

New direction and return to Ligue 1 
In the 2017–18 Ligue 2 season, Lens lost their first seven matches in a row, the worst start to a season in the club's history. On 18 September, Lens finally got their first win of the season over US Quevilly-Rouen 2–0.

In the 2018–19 Ligue 2 season, Lens finished 5th on the table and reached the promotion play off final against Dijon FCO. After a 1–1 draw in the first leg, Lens would lose the second leg and the tie 3-1 after two goalkeeping blunders by Jérémy Vachoux cost his side a chance of promotion to Ligue 1.

On 30 April 2020, Lens were promoted to Ligue 1 after the LFP decided to end the seasons of both Ligue 1 and Ligue 2 early due to the COVID-19 pandemic in France. Lens were second on the table in Ligue 2 at the time of the decision.

In the 2020–21 season, Lens finished 7th on the Ligue 1 table after an impressive first season back in France's top flight. They finished seventh again in the following season with 62 points, despite being ranked second behind Paris Saint-Germain in the first half of the season.

In the 2022–23 season, Lens won 10 games out of 10 at home during the first part of the season. On 1 January 2023, Lens beat PSG 3–1 and became the first team to defeat Paris, which had been unbeaten since the start of the season. Halfway through the season, Lens is second, three points behind PSG. On 1 March 2023, Lens was eliminated of the Coupe de France after a 2–1 defeat against Nantes in the quarter finals.

Honours 
Ligue 1
Winners (1): 1997–98
Runners-up (4): 1955–56, 1956–57, 1976–77, 2001–02
Ligue 2 
Winners (4): 1936–37, 1948–49, 1972–73, 2008–09
Runners-up: (2): 2013–14, 2019–20
Coupe de France
Runners-up (3): 1947–48, 1974–75, 1997–98
Coupe de la Ligue
Winners (1): 1998–99
Runners-up (1): 2007–08
Coupe Drago
Winners (3): 1959, 1960, 1965
Runners-up (1): 1957
Coupe Gambardella 
Winners (3): 1957, 1958, 1992
Runners-up (4): 1979, 1983, 1993, 1995
UEFA Cup (now the UEFA Europa League)
Semi-finalists (1): 1999–2000
UEFA Intertoto Cup
Winners (2): 2005, 2007 (joint winner)

Records 

Record league win : 10–2 (v. RC Paris, 1963–64).
Record European Cup win : 0–7 (v. Avenir-Beggen, 1995–96).
The European exploit : v. Lazio (6–0 after extra time, 2 November 1977).
Most goals in a single match : 16, Stefan Dembicki, which is a world record, (v. Auby Asturies, French Cup, 13 December 1942). Final score: 32–0.
Most league appearances with Lens : 497, Éric Sikora and 377, Bernard Placzek.
Most league goals in a season : 30, Ahmed Oudjani (1963–64) and 20,  Roger Boli (1993–94).
Top scorer : 94, Ahmed Oudjani.
Highest attendance at a home match : 48, 912, (v. Marseille, Ligue 1, 15 February 1992) at Stade Bollaert-Delelis. Lens won 2–1.

Current squad

First team

...

Out on loan

Reserve squad

Retired numbers

12 –  Club Supporters (the 12th Man) 
17 –  Marc-Vivien Foé, Midfielder (1994–99) – posthumous honour

Former players 
Three Lens players won the gold medal in the 1984 Los Angeles Olympic Games: defender Didier Sénac, as well as strikers François Brisson and Daniel Xuereb who scored a goal apiece in France's triumph over Brazil 2–0 in the final at the Pasadena Rose Bowl in front of a crowd of 103,000.

For a complete list of RC Lens players, see :Category:RC Lens players

French internationals
As of 7 July 2022

* Still playing.

Club officials

Presidents

1906–07 : Jules J. Van den Weghe
1907–08 : Lotin
1908–12 : Jules J. Van den Weghe
1912–20 : Charles Douterlinghe
1920–23 : Marcel Pierron
1923–30 : Pierre Moglia
1930–33 : Renoult
1933–34 : Jules A. Van den Weghe
1934–57 : Louis Brossard
1957–59 : Vital Lerat
1959–68 : Albert Hus
1968–72 : René Houdart
1972–76 : Jean Bondoux
1976–79 : Jean-Pierre Defontaine
1979–86 : Jean Bondoux
1986–88 : Jean Honvault
1988–2012 : Gervais Martel
2012–13 : Luc Dayan
2013–17 : Gervais Martel
2017– : Joseph Oughourlian

Coaches
Former coaches include two ex France coaches: Gérard Houllier (1982–85) managed France between July 1992 and November 1993, and Roger Lemerre (second half of the 1996–97 season, then as assistant coach 1997–98), who coached France between July 1998 and July 2002.

 Jack Harris (1934)
 Robert De Veen (1934–36)
 Jack Galbraith (1936–38)
 Raymond François (1938)
 József Eisenhoffer (1938–39)
 Jack Galbraith (1939)
 Richard Buisson (1939–41)
 Georges Beaucourt (1941–42)
 Anton Marek (1942–47)
 Nicolas Hibst (1947–50)
 Ludvic Dupal (1950–53)
 Anton Marek (1953–56)
 Félix Witkowski (1956–58)
 Karel Michlowski (1956–58)
 Jules Bigot (1958–62)
 Élie Fruchart (1962–69)
 Arnold Sowinski (1970–78)
 Roger Lemerre (1978–79)
 Arnold Sowinski (1979–81)
 Jean Serafin (1981–82)
 Gérard Houllier (1982–85)
 Joachim Marx (1985–88)
 Arnold Sowinski (1988)
 Jean Parisseaux (1988–89)
 Philippe Redon (1989)
 Marcel Husson (1989–90)
 Arnaud Dos Santos (1990–92)
 Patrice Bergues (1992–96)
 Slavoljub Muslin (1996–97)
 Roger Lemerre (1997)
 Daniel Leclercq (1997–99)
 François Brisson (1999–00)
 Rolland Courbis (2000–01)
 Georges Tournay (2001)
 Joël Muller (2001–Jan. 2005)
 Francis Gillot (Jan. 2005–07)
 Guy Roux (2007)
 Jean-Pierre Papin (Aug. 2007–08)
 Jean-Guy Wallemme (2008–Jan. 11)
 László Bölöni (Jan. 2011–June 11)
 Jean-Louis Garcia (June 2011–Sept. 12)
 Éric Sikora (Sept. 2012–July 13)
 Antoine Kombouaré (July 2013–May 2016)
 Alain Casanova (May 2016–Aug. 2017) 
 Éric Sikora (Aug. 2017–May 2018)
 Philippe Montanier (May 2018–Feb 2020)
 Franck Haise (Feb 2020–present)

See also
 Derby du Nord

References

External links

 La Gailette: Racing Club de Lens' prolific academy – These Football Times (2015)

 
 
Association football clubs established in 1906
1906 establishments in France
RC Lens
Mining association football teams
L
Sport in Pas-de-Calais
Football clubs in France
Football clubs in Hauts-de-France
Ligue 1 clubs